Petunia is a genus of flowering plants.

Petunia may also refer to:

Arts and entertainment
 Petunia (film), a 2012 American independent film
 "Petunia, the Gardener's Daughter", a song performed by Elvis Presley
 Petunia Pig, a cartoon character
 Aunt Petunia (disambiguation), several fictional characters, including Harry Potter's aunt
 Joe and Petunia, characters from a series of public information films
 Ms. Petunia, a ghost in the Nintendo game Luigi's Mansion
 A character from Happy Tree Friends
 A rabbit marionette created by ventriloquist Darci Lynne

Other
 Petunia (given name)
 Petunia, Virginia
 Petunia Peak, a mountain in Washington state
 968 Petunia, a minor planet